"Morning Side of the Mountain" is a song written by Larry Stock and Dick Manning and first recorded in 1951 by Tommy Edwards. It settled at #24 on the pop chart. Edwards re-recorded it  in 1959, reaching #27 on the Billboard Hot 100.  The re-release was featured as the B-side of Edwards' other hit, a cover of Johnnie Ray's 1952 success , "Please Mr. Sun."

Donny & Marie Osmond cover
Late in 1974, Donny & Marie Osmond released a version which scored #8 on the Billboard Hot 100 and spent one week at #1 on the Easy Listening chart.  The song charted equally well in Canada and the UK.

Chart performance

Weekly charts

Year-end charts

See also
List of number-one adult contemporary singles of 1975 (U.S.)

References

1951 songs
1959 singles
1974 singles
Tommy Edwards songs
Donny Osmond songs
Marie Osmond songs
MGM Records singles
Songs written by Dick Manning
Songs written by Larry Stock
Song recordings produced by Michael Lloyd
Song recordings produced by Mike Curb